Alex Mativo  (born 21 April 1994) is a Kenyan entrepreneur and fashion designer.

He is the founder and CEO of E-LAB,  a company aimed at eradicating electronic waste in Africa by transforming it into products for the fashion and interior design industry. He is also the recipient of the Queen's Young Leaders Award.

He has two companies. He founded Nanasi  which helps businesses and brands sell on all the different social networks using a single platform.

His other company Ethnic Brand  is a virtual factory for fashion brands.

Early life 
Alex Mativo was born in Nairobi, Kenya grew up in Athi-river. He attended Lenana school in Nairobi.

Career 
In 2013 Mativo founded E-LAB, to help solve the problem of electronic waste in his community.

In the same year his company E-LAB participated in the Startup open competition was listed among the global entrepreneurship week top 50 most innovative companies in the world by the Global Entrepreneurship week and the Kauffman foundation

He is also the Founder and CEO of the retail company Nanasi.

Enterprise and entrepreneurship 

Mativo has spoken to audiences across Africa to share his business start-up story. Notable public speaking appearances include a  TEDx talk on why we should embrace design thinking at the African Leadership University in May 2016 alongside the President of the Republic of Mauritius Ameenah Gurib-Fakim .

He was also an attendee of the 2015 "one young world summit" in Bangkok, Thailand where he represented his country Kenya.

Mativo has developed several high impact projects through E-LAB which have resulted in the eradication of 3000 tons electronic waste Across Africa.

His work has been featured on international media houses notably CNN, Al Jazeera, eNCA Africa and the BBC.

Awards 
 2015 DXD (disruption by design) upcoming disruptor of the year by Up Magazine
 GEW 50 2013 by Global entrepreneurship week
 Queen's Young Leaders Award 2016
Global Student Entrepreneurship Award 2017

References 

1994 births
Kenyan businesspeople
Living people
People from Nairobi